Alexander James Milne (29 September 1889 – 1970) was an English footballer who played in the Football League for Doncaster Rovers and Stoke.

Career
Milne was born in Hebburn and joined Stoke at the age of 23 after playing amateur football with West Stanley and Hebburn Argyle. He made his debut in a Southern League match against West Ham United which Stoke lost 5–0. He became known for his no-nonsense tackling and solid performances at left back and helped the club to gain a return to the Football League in 1914–15. However it was delayed due to the outbreak of World War I during which time Milne returned to his home of Hebburn.

The league returned in 1919 and Milne established himself in the starting eleven and played in every match during the 1920–21 season and helped the side gain promotion to the First Division in 1921–22. Stoke were relegated however and injury caused Milne to miss all of the 1923–24 campaign. He remained at the Victoria Ground for two more seasons before leaving for Doncaster Rovers after making 276 appearances in all competitions for the "Potters". He remained at Doncaster until he was 41.

Career statistics
Source:

Honours
 Stoke
 Southern Football League Division Two champion: 1914–15
 Football League Second Division runner-up: 1921–22

References

1889 births
1970 deaths
People from Hebburn
Footballers from Tyne and Wear
English footballers
Association football fullbacks
West Stanley F.C. players
Hebburn Argyle F.C. players
Stoke City F.C. players
Doncaster Rovers F.C. players
Southern Football League players
English Football League players
Date of death missing